Matakana is a small town in the Rodney Ward of Auckland Council of New Zealand. Warkworth lies about 9 km (5½ miles) to the south-west, Snells Beach the same distance to the south, Omaha is about 7 km (4¼ miles) to the east, and Leigh about 13 km (8 miles) to the north-east. The Matakana River flows through the town and into Kawau Bay to the south-east.

The surrounding area contains several vineyards and breweries, developing a name for pinot gris, merlot, syrah and a host of obscure varietals. Offering 'a slice of rural community life', the area offers craft outlets, markets, boutique stores, and country cafes. The reasonable proximity to Auckland (around one hour's drive off-peak) has led to the region becoming a trendy getaway spot for foodie Aucklanders.

Lonely Planet describes the village:"Around 15 years ago, Matakana was a nondescript rural village with a handful of heritage buildings and an old-fashioned country pub. Now the locals watch bemused as Auckland’s chattering classes idle away the hours in stylish wine bars and cafes."From 2018, it is served by 7 buses a day between Warkworth and Omaha. From 2013 it had 5 buses a day and is also served by Mahu City Express. Matakana has had a bus since at least 1930, including buses to Auckland.

History 
Māori inhabitants of the area were from Ngāti Raupo, a hapu of Te Kawerau, Ngāti Manuhiri) and Ngāti Rongo. Crown purchases started in 1841 with the Mahurangi Purchase, described by the Waitangi Tribunal as, "a crazy quilt of multiple and overlapping transactions". Loggers then moved in to fell the kauri and other timber. George Darroch had a large shipyard building timber ships by 1852, which continued for over 50 years. By 1853 John Heyd'n's sawmill was at the falls on the Matakana river. Flax was also harvested. Matakana's first public building, the Presbyterian School and church, opened in 1864. By 1881,  Matakana had about 150 people and most of the bush had been cut. Agriculture replaced it, especially fruit. Matakana Dairy Factory opened in December 1902; the building is now a shop. A shark oil factory opened in 1905 and continued till at least 1921 and the industry longer. Electricity came to Matakana in 1936.

First World War Memorial 
Matakana's First World War Memorial is a listed landmark dedicated to thirteen men from the district who lost their lives in the First World War. The memorial was unveiled on 24 April 1920 by Joseph Gordon Coates, making it the first statue memorial unveiled in New Zealand following the 1918 armistice. Following restoration of the memorial, on 24 April 2000 another plaque dedicated the memorial to seven men from the district who died in the Second World War.
 
The memorial features an early statue of George V that was sculpted from Oamaru stone by a New Zealand sculptor, William Henry Feldon. Instead of ordering a sculpted figure from overseas, which soldier and politician Sir James Allen recommended at the time, local subscribers commissioned Feldon for the memorials in Matakana, Papakura, Helensville, Mercer, Otahuhu, and the Arawa Memorial in Rotorua. For a small community of 313, Matakana suffered a fatality rate twice the national rate. The memorial was sited prominently on donated land at the town junction next to the wharf where the servicemen were fare welled.
 
Matakana's local militia unit became a troop of the Auckland Mounted Rifles. Feldon was the Brigade major of the Auckland Mounted Rifles. The theme of the statue has George V in field marshal cavalry full dress uniform. In the statue's right hand is a scroll signifying the King's Proclamation of 7 November 1918 calling for two minute's silence, in the left hand is an Auckland Mounted Rifles sword prepared to be raised in victory.
 
The statue has been vandalised and restored several times. In 2006 the memorial was moved from its original location on the corner of Matakana Wharf Road and Matakana Road to a nearby site in the Matakana Wharf Reserve. The original site is now occupied by the 'usable art' Matakana Toilets.

Demographics
Matakana is part of the larger Dome Valley-Matakana statistical area.

Matakana had a population of 492 at the 2018 New Zealand census, an increase of 177 people (56.2%) since the 2013 census, and an increase of 225 people (84.3%) since the 2006 census. There were 180 households, comprising 225 males and 267 females, giving a sex ratio of 0.84 males per female, with 111 people (22.6%) aged under 15 years, 51 (10.4%) aged 15 to 29, 231 (47.0%) aged 30 to 64, and 99 (20.1%) aged 65 or older.

Ethnicities were 92.1% European/Pākehā, 9.1% Māori, 1.8% Pacific peoples, 4.3% Asian, and 1.8% other ethnicities. People may identify with more than one ethnicity.

Although some people chose not to answer the census's question about religious affiliation, 62.8% had no religion, 27.4% were Christian, 0.6% were Buddhist and 1.8% had other religions.

Of those at least 15 years old, 123 (32.3%) people had a bachelor's or higher degree, and 48 (12.6%) people had no formal qualifications. 111 people (29.1%) earned over $70,000 compared to 17.2% nationally. The employment status of those at least 15 was that 183 (48.0%) people were employed full-time, 69 (18.1%) were part-time, and 15 (3.9%) were unemployed.

Dome Valley-Matakana statistical area

Dome Valley-Matakana had a population of 1,530 at the 2018 New Zealand census, an increase of 246 people (19.2%) since the 2013 census, and an increase of 408 people (36.4%) since the 2006 census. There were 546 households, comprising 759 males and 771 females, giving a sex ratio of 0.98 males per female. The median age was 46.6 years (compared with 37.4 years nationally), with 306 people (20.0%) aged under 15 years, 189 (12.4%) aged 15 to 29, 726 (47.5%) aged 30 to 64, and 312 (20.4%) aged 65 or older.

Ethnicities were 93.7% European/Pākehā, 8.4% Māori, 1.8% Pacific peoples, 3.9% Asian, and 1.8% other ethnicities. People may identify with more than one ethnicity.

The percentage of people born overseas was 24.1, compared with 27.1% nationally.

Although some people chose not to answer the census's question about religious affiliation, 64.1% had no religion, 26.5% were Christian, 0.6% were Muslim, 0.6% were Buddhist and 1.4% had other religions.

Of those at least 15 years old, 336 (27.5%) people had a bachelor's or higher degree, and 180 (14.7%) people had no formal qualifications. The median income was $34,900, compared with $31,800 nationally. 285 people (23.3%) earned over $70,000 compared to 17.2% nationally. The employment status of those at least 15 was that 570 (46.6%) people were employed full-time, 240 (19.6%) were part-time, and 33 (2.7%) were unemployed.

Matakana Diamond Jubilee Park

History 
Opened in 1897. There is a full history documented in 

Matakana Annual Races and Sports. There was a horse racing track in the heart of Matakana township, laid out on Dr Cruickshank’s property, with meetings held on New Year’s Day and Easter Monday (approx. 1870 to 1897). The meetings incorporated an Athletics element as well as horse racing. The area is now The Diamond Jubilee Park, which opened subsequent to the abandonment of the racetrack and to celebrate Queen Victoria’s 60 years on the throne.

Initially the Park was used for A&P Shows (1898), Rugby, cricket, hockey and tennis.

Matakana Cricket Club moved to the Park when it opened and was famous for its Boxing Day cricket matches

Tennis courts were established in the 1920s

The ex Kawau Island schoolroom from Matakana School was moved onto the Park behind the tennis courts, in the early 1960s. Scouts and Guides ran from there and held a lease until 2003. On the 4th of November 2008 the building now in disrepair was control burned by the Matakana Fire Brigade

Rugby and hockey were played until the 1960s

Soccer was played by school children during the winter season at the souther end. Records exist with council of this until 1996

The Matakana Pony Club met for the first time in 1977 with a September to April Season.

The Pony club and sports clubs shared the Park

Usage 
Pony Club

Tennis Club

Walking

Dogs

Future Community Usage 
To further the development of the Matakana Open Space Study and gain community commentary on the future use of Matakana Jubilee Park, Auckland Council led a consultation process with the general public culminating in the report REGIONAL OPEN SPACE STUDY + ENHANCEMENT RECOMMENDATIONS

The purpose of the consultation was to present to the community a series of options for Matakana Jubilee Park, and spark discussion and commentary about what future vision of the park is preferred across the community. Materials were presented to the wider-public for feedback. These included three options for Matakana Jubilee Park, each differing in programme and space allowances for different activities.

in 2020 A lease that formalises shared use of the Diamond Jubilee Park in Matakana between the village pony club and the wider community was granted by Rodney Local Board.

Education
Matakana School is a coeducational contributing primary (years 1–6) school with a roll of   students as of  The school was established in 1862.

Events
Matakana hosts many varied events throughout the year.
The Matakana Farmers' Market is held every Saturday.
Matakana War Memorial - ANZAC Day Service - 10am

Notes

Related links
Matakana Village retail development website
Matakana War Memorial
Matakana Cemetery
1:50,000 map
1942 one inch map

Rodney Local Board Area
Populated places in the Auckland Region
Matakana Coast